Zdeněk Miler (21 February 1921 – 30 November 2011) was a Czech animator and illustrator best known for his Mole (Krtek or Krteček in original) character and its adventures.

Early years

Miler was born in Kladno just west of Prague, the capital of what was then Czechoslovakia. He became an animator partly because of the Nazi occupation of Czechoslovakia. He took part in the demonstrations held consequent to the death of Jan Opletal, which led to the closing of universities and colleges. He escaped being sent to a concentration camp and instead wound up working as an animator.

Miler enjoyed painting as a child. His hobby developed when he joined the national graphic school in Prague in 1942. He later studied at the College of Arts and Crafts (Uměleckoprůmyslová škola Praha). In 1948, he began work at the cartoon studio Baťa in Zlín. There, he learned the important practical skills relating to film production, specializing in animated films. After the Second World War, he started work at the cartoon company Bratři v triku and worked first as draughtsman, then author and director. He later became the head of the company.

In 2001, Miler announced that he would no longer be making more films, citing health reasons.

Death
Having retired in 2001, Zdeněk Miler lived at a nursing home in Prague. He was later diagnosed with a form of demyelinating disease, which was strongly suspected to be either Guillain–Barré syndrome or multiple sclerosis. He eventually contracted bronchopneumonia, making his condition even worse than before.

On 30 November 2011, Miler died at a nursing home from cardiac arrest secondary to bronchopneumonia, less than three months before his 91st birthday. Miler was cremated on the day after his death, and he is interred at the Slavín tomb in Prague's Vyšehrad Cemetery.

Krtek (the mole)

Miler made about 70 films. In approximately fifty of them, the protagonist was his most famous creation, the small mole (Krtek in Czech). The idea for its creation came when he was commissioned to make an educational film for children in 1956. He was not happy with the script he was given. Since he was strongly influenced by the films of Walt Disney, he looked for an animal as the main character. Later, he said that the idea to use a mole as his main character came to him when he stumbled over a mole hill during a walk. The first film was titled Jak krtek ke kalhotkám přišel (How the mole got his trousers), which won a Silver Lion at the Venice Film Festival. In the beginning, the mole spoke, but Miler wanted his creation to be understood everywhere in the world, so he decided to use his daughters as voice actors, reducing the speech to short non-figurative exclamations in order to express Krtek's feelings and world perception. His daughters were also his test audience, who got to see the films first. Thus, Miler could see whether his message resonated with children.

Krtek was a huge success in Czechoslovakia, Eastern Europe, and Germany from the beginning, and today Krtek can be seen in over eighty countries.

Works

Krtek

Other films

References

External links
 
 Krátký Film Praha

1921 births
2011 deaths
Czech animators
Czech film directors
Czech animated film directors
Czech animated film producers
Czechoslovak film directors
People from Kladno
People with Guillain–Barré syndrome
Recipients of Medal of Merit (Czech Republic)
Burials at Vyšehrad Cemetery